Juan Alzóloras, O.S.H or Juan Arzolaras (died 7 May 1574) served as Archbishop (personal title) of Islas Canarias (1568–1574) and Archbishop of Santo Domingo (1566–1568).

Biography
Juan Alzóloras was ordained a monk in the Order of Saint Jerome.
On 15 February 1566, he was appointed by the King of Spain and confirmed by Pope Pius V as Archbishop of Santo Domingo. 
On 17 September 1568, he was appointed by Pope Pius V as Archbishop (personal title) of Islas Canarias where he served until his death on 7 May 1574.

See also
Catholic Church in Spain

References

External links and additional sources
 (for Chronology of Bishops) 
 (for Chronology of Bishops) 
 (for Chronology of Bishops) 
 (for Chronology of Bishops) 

1574 deaths
Roman Catholic archbishops of Santo Domingo
Bishops appointed by Pope Pius V
Bishops appointed by Pope Clement VII
Hieronymite bishops
16th-century Roman Catholic archbishops in the Dominican Republic